Allied Stores was a department store chain in the United States. It was founded in the 1930s as part of a general consolidation in the retail sector by B. E. Puckett. See also Associated Dry Goods. It was the successor to Hahn's Department Stores, a holding company founded in 1928.  In 1935 Hahn's was reorganized into Allied Stores.

In 1981, Allied Stores acquired the 24-year-old retail conglomerate Garfinckel, Brooks Brothers, Miller & Rhoads, Inc. for $228 million. With that transaction they acquired 178 department stores and 48 specialty shops in 28 states. In 1986 the chain was acquired by Campeau Corporation under Canadian entrepreneur Robert Campeau. In 1988 it merged with Federated Department Stores (now known as Macy's, Inc.), and the chains were consolidated in 1990 under the Federated name after Chapter 11 bankruptcy.

Stores

Department stores divisions at time of Campeau buyout
Jordan Marsh founded in 1841, acquired by Hahn's in 1928, retained by Campeau. Merged with Federated's Abraham & Straus in 1992 becoming A&S/Jordan Marsh. Merged into Macy's in 1994 and renamed Macy's in 1996.
Jordan Marsh Florida (offshoot of the New England chain) founded in 1956, consolidated with Maas Brothers in 1987.
William H. Block, Indianapolis, Indiana, acquired by Allied 1962, sold to Federated in 1987 prior to merger; Several stores became F&R Lazarus & Co. locations, others were sold or closed.
The Bon Marché of Seattle, Washington, founded 1890, acquired by Hahn's in 1927, retained by Campeau. Renamed Bon-Macy's in 2003 and changed to Macy's in 2005   
Cain Sloan, Nashville, Tennessee, acquired by Dillard's 1987.
Dey Brothers, Syracuse, New York,  sold to Wilfree Property 1987.
Donaldson's of Minneapolis, Minnesota, was founded in 1883 and acquired by Allied Stores Corp. in 1928. Later acquired Powers Dry Goods, it was sold to Carson Pirie Scott in 1987.
Herpolsheimer's, Grand Rapids, Michigan, sold along with the William H. Block stores to Federated in 1987 (prior to merger); Stores briefly became Lazarus stores and later closed.
Heer's, Springfield, Missouri.
Joske's of San Antonio, Texas, taken over 1932, after 1987 acquired by Dillard's after Allied merged with Federated. 
Maas Brothers, Tampa, Florida, founded in 1886, acquired by Hahn's in 1929, retained by Campeau. Consolidated with Jordan Marsh Florida in 1987. Renamed Maas Brothers/Jordan Marsh in 1989. Merged into Burdines in 1991.
Miller & Rhoads, Richmond, Virginia.
Miller's, Johnson City, Kingsport, Chattanooga, and Knoxville, Tennessee; Bristol, Virginia – sold to Hess's 1987.
Pomeroy's, Reading, Harrisburg, Wilkes-Barre and Levittown, Pennsylvania, Willingboro, New Jersey, Acquired by Hahn's on 9/18/1934, sold to The Bon-Ton in 1987.
Read's Department Stores, Bridgeport, Connecticut, merged into Jordan Marsh 1987.
Stern's (Stern Brothers) of New Jersey was acquired by Allied in 1951. Division closed and most stores converted to Macy's or Bloomingdales 2001.
L.H. Field & Co. (Field's) Jackson, Michigan, established in 1891, became part of Allied Stores in 1933. Field's was successful for many years with three local stores. With Allied, Field's was a sister store to Herpolsheimer's (Herp's) in Grand Rapids, MI. Also, L.H. Field was a cousin of Marshall Field, who established the famed department store in Chicago, IL in 1881. Allied/Federated was acquired by Campeau Corporation of Toronto, ON in 1986. Campeau announced the closure of all Field's unit stores December 24, 1986, and the store was officially closed May 23, 1987.

Specialty stores divisions at time of Campeau buyout
Ann Taylor, New York, initially retained by Campeau, sold off in 1989.
Bonwit Teller, New York, acquired 1979, sold to Hooker Corporation in 1987.
Brooks Brothers, New York, initially retained by Campeau, sold in 1988 to Marks & Spencer of London, acquired by Retail Brand Alliance in 2001.
Catherine's, Memphis and Nashville, Tennessee, and Los Angeles, California.
Jerry Leonard.
Garfinckels, Washington, D.C., sold to Raleigh's 1987.
Plymouth, New York, sold to Tribeca Holdings 1987. By the mid-1990s the chain was closed.

Other Stores
Almart, Discount department store operating in Florida, Tennessee, Kentucky, Virginia, Delaware, Pennsylvania, Ohio, and New York
Barnes – Woodin, Yakima, Washington, Merged with Draper's in 1953, eventually became the Bon Marché.
James Black Company (also known as Black's), Waterloo, Iowa, Three locations, downtown Waterloo, Crossroads Mall and College Hills Mall in Cedar Falls, Iowa. Transferred to Donaldson's in 1978 and name change. Downtown store closed July 3, 1981, as Donaldson's. Two mall locations operated as Donaldson's then Carson Pirie Scott until 1989.
Gertz, Jamaica, New York, merged into Stern's
Golden Rule, Saint Paul, Minnesota, acquired by Hahn's in 1928, became Donaldson's Golden Rule, eventually fully merged into Donaldson's.
C. C. Anderson's, Boise, Idaho, acquired by Allied in 1937, eventually part of Bon Marché.
A. M. Jensen's, Walla Walla, Washington, acquired by Allied in 1946, became the Bon Marché in 1951.
Laubach's, Easton, Pennsylvania, acquired 1947 and merged into Pomeroy's. Closed 1970s.
Levy's, Savannah, Georgia, merged into Maas Brothers, February 1986.
Rollman & Sons, Cincinnati
Rumbaugh-MacLain of Everett, Washington, in 1944, acquired and merged into The Bon Marché. Southwest corner of Wetmore & California. Designed by Portland architects Doyle & Merriam, specialists in larger store buildings. Opened just six months before the Wall Street Crash (1929) that began the Great Depression. 
Titche-Goettinger of Dallas, Texas, later name changed to Joske's, Dallas.
Wren's, Springfield, Ohio, merged into Block's.
Quackenbush, Paterson, New Jersey (merged with Stern's in late 1960s).
Troutman's, eight locations in Western Pennsylvania:  Butler, Connellsville, Greensburg – Downtown (Flagship Store), Greensburg – Westmoreland Mall (now The Bon-Ton), Indiana, Latrobe, New Castle, Washington Crown Center (now The Bon-Ton). Merged with Pomeroy's in 1984.
Mabley & Carew, Cincinnati, Ohio.  Stores sold to Elder-Beerman; now closed.
Polsky's, Akron, Ohio; acquired by Allied in 1929, eventually expanded to four stores in Northern Ohio.  This chain was shut down in December, 1978, as Allied wanted to concentrate investment in their Southwest region stores.
Harzfeld's, Kansas City, Missouri, acquired 1981, closed 1984.
Sterling-Lindner Co., Cleveland, Ohio; acquired Lindner & Davis Co. in 1947; merged with Sterling & Welch in 1950; closed in 1968.
The Fashion (Columbus, Ohio), purchased by Allied Stores in 1949; later merged with Morehouse Martens to form Morehouse Fashion; Name later shortened to The Fashion. Closed in 1969; Space taken over by The Union department store and later Halle's.
The Palace, Spokane, Washington; purchased from Kemp & Hebert stores in 1951, divested soon after.
The Paris of Montana, Great Falls, Montana, acquired 1937, when owned by C. C. Anderson's, merged into The Bon Marché; The Bon closed the former location in 1999.

References

Defunct department stores based in Washington, D.C.
Retail companies established in 1935
Retail companies disestablished in 1990
Defunct clothing retailers of the United States
Private equity portfolio companies
Defunct companies based in Washington, D.C.
1935 establishments in Washington, D.C.
1990 disestablishments in Washington, D.C.
American companies established in 1935
American companies disestablished in 1990
Companies that filed for Chapter 11 bankruptcy in 1990